is a former Japanese football player. She played for Japan national team.

Club career
Ozawa was born in Kamakura on 7 December 1973. She joined Nissan FC in 1989. In 1993 season, she was selected Best Eleven. However, the club was disbanded. She moved to Tokyo Shidax LSC in 1994. But, in 1995, the club was disbanded again. She moved to Fujita SC Mercury in 1996. End of 1997 season, she retired.

National team career
In December 1993, when Ozawa was 19 years old, she was selected Japan national team for 1993 AFC Championship. At this competition, on 4 December, she debuted against Chinese Taipei. She also played at 1994 Asian Games. She was a member of Japan for 1995 World Cup and 1996 Summer Olympics. She played 21 games for Japan until 1997.

National team statistics

References

External links

 United States' Victory Gives Norway a Chance at Revenge New York Times

1973 births
Living people
Asia University (Japan) alumni
People from Kamakura
Association football people from Kanagawa Prefecture
Japanese women's footballers
Japan women's international footballers
Nadeshiko League players
Nissan FC Ladies players
Tokyo Shidax LSC players
Fujita SC Mercury players
1995 FIFA Women's World Cup players
Olympic footballers of Japan
Footballers at the 1996 Summer Olympics
Women's association football goalkeepers
Asian Games medalists in football
Asian Games silver medalists for Japan
Footballers at the 1994 Asian Games
Medalists at the 1994 Asian Games